Samir is a 2019 drama / crime and thriller film about a real estate agent who is framed for a crime he didn't commit and is sent to prison for thirteen years. After he served his sentence in prison, he does everything in his power to get even with the people who have destroyed his life.

Plot 
A real estate agent named Samir (Ethan Rains) gets setup by his colleagues and decides to take matters into his own hands by giving them what they deserve with a taste of revenge and pain.

Cast

Production

Crew 

 Directed by Chateau Bezerra (also known as Chateaubriand Bezerra), Julia Kennedy, Sarah Gross, Michael Basha, Reeyaz Habib, Sadé Clacken Joseph, Maria De Sanctis, Christina YR Lim, and Sohil Vaidya. 
 Written by Michael Basha, Mallika Dhaliwal, and Jennifer Frazin.
 Produced by Miriam Arghandiwal and David Liu.
 Cinematography by Ante Cheng.

Development 

 This is a USC Originals film, and it was created with the help from Warner Bros. Entertainment.

Release 
On October 18, 2019, the film was released to the public.

Accolades 
Samir is an official selection for the 2019 Heartland International Film Festival.

References

External links 

 Samir at IMDb

2010s American films
2010s English-language films
2019 action thriller films
American action thriller films
Films set in California
Films set in Los Angeles
Films shot in Los Angeles